Georgatos is a Greek surname. It may refer to:

Angelos Georgatos, mayor of Athens during the years of the Hellenic State (1941–1944)
Gerry Georgatos (born 1962), Australian researcher and social justice advocate
Grigoris Georgatos (born 1972), retired Greek footballer

Greek-language surnames